Harold Stott (24 April 1899 – 14 February 1955) was an English professional footballer who played as an outside forward in the Football League for Brentford.

Career statistics

References

English footballers
English Football League players
Brentford F.C. players
Association football outside forwards
North Shields F.C. players
Aston Villa F.C. players
Sportspeople from North Shields
Footballers from Tyne and Wear
1899 births
1955 deaths
Barnsley F.C. players